Eadgyth of Aylesbury also known as Eadridus was a Dark Ages Catholic saint from Anglo-Saxon England.

History
She is known to history mainly through the hagiography of the Secgan Manuscript, but also the Anglo-Saxon Chronicle

She was the daughter of Penda of Mercia. One of her sisters was Eadburh of Bicester; the other, Wilburga, was married to Frithuwold of Chertsey. Wilburga's daughter St Osyth grew up in the care of her maternal aunts.

A Saint Edith is also mentioned in Conchubran's Life of Saint Modwenna, a female hermit who supposedly lived near Burton-on-Trent. The text, written in the early 11th century, mentions a sister of King Alfred by the name of Ite, a nun who served as the Kings tutor and had a maidservant called Osid. Although an Irish nun called St Ita was active in the 7th century, Ite's name has been interpreted as "almost certainly a garbling of Edith" and that of Osid a rendering of Osgyth.

See also
 Edith of Polesworth

Further reading
 Hohler, C. (1966). "St Osyth of Aylesbury". Records of Buckinghamshire 18.1: 61–72.
 Hagerty, R. P. (1987). "The Buckinghamshire Saints Reconsidered 2: St Osyth and St Edith of Aylesbury". Records of Buckinghamshire 29: 125–32

References

Anglo-Saxon nuns
7th-century English nuns
People from Aylesbury
7th-century Christian saints
Mercian saints
East Saxon saints
Year of birth unknown
Christian female saints of the Middle Ages